Westmont High School may refer to several schools in the United States:

Westmont High School (California)
Westmont High School (Westmont, Illinois)
Westmont Hilltop High School, Pennsylvania

See also
Westmount High School, Westmount, Quebec, Canada